Stan Martin is a New Zealand former rugby league footballer who played in the 1950s through to the 1980s, and coached in the 1990s and 2000s. He coached at representative level for the Cook Islands at the 2000 World Cup and New Zealand (Kiwi Ferns) to victory in the 2008 Women's Rugby League World Cup, and at club level for Marist Saints, Counties Manukau and Whitehaven.

Playing career
A Richmond Bulldogs player in the Auckland Rugby League competition, Martin won the Rothville Trophy in 1980 as the Premier One player of the year. He toured Australia in 1973 with the Auckland under-23 side.

Coaching career
Martin began his career coaching the Marist Saints in the Auckland Rugby League.

Martin was the inaugural coach of the Counties Manukau Heroes in the Lion Red Cup between 1994 and 1995. At the end of the 1994 season he was named the coach of the year. In 1995 Martin was also the coach of the Junior Kiwis.

Martin then left New Zealand, signing with Whitehaven in England. He coached Whitehaven for four years before returning to New Zealand. During his time at Whitehaven he enticed a number of New Zealand players to join the club; Aaron Lester, David Fatialofa, Leroy Joe, Siose Muliumu and Gus Malietoa-Brown. He still retains close links with the club.

At the 2000 World Cup Martin coached the Cook Islands team.

In 1999, 2001, 2004 and 2005 Martin coached the Auckland side.

In 2005 Martin was appointed coach of the Kiwi Ferns, the New Zealand national women's rugby league team. He remained in this position until 2010, when he shifted to the role of technical advisor.

Since 2009 Martin has been a registered player agent for the NRL.

References

External links
Player Statistics at rugbyleagueproject.org
Coach Statistics at rugbyleagueproject.org

Living people
Auckland rugby league team coaches
Cook Islands national rugby league team coaches
Counties Manukau rugby league team coaches
Junior Kiwis coaches
Marist Saints coaches
New Zealand rugby league coaches
New Zealand rugby league players
New Zealand women's national rugby league team coaches
Place of birth missing (living people)
Richmond Bulldogs players
Rugby league player agents
Whitehaven R.L.F.C. coaches
Year of birth missing (living people)